Sallie Fisher (August 10, 1880  June 8, 1950) was an American stage and vaudeville actress who appeared in the 1916 silent The Little Shepherd of Bargain Row.

Early years
Fisher "was born on a ranch in Wyoming" but moved with her family to Salt Lake City "when a very little girl." She was educated by tutors. (In a 1909 interview, Fisher told a reporter that she was born in Salt Lake City.)

Stage
Fisher appeared in musical comedy, musical farce, fantasy, operetta, revue and revivals. She debuted in Salt Lake City with the Salt Lake Opera Company. In Chicago, "she rose from the chorus of a comic opera company to the ranks of the truly elect, otherwise known as prima donna."

In 1907, an article in The Washington Post described Fisher as having been "for several seasons a prima donna in the Dillingham forces." She appeared with George M. Cohan in 45 Minutes from Broadway and with John Barrymore in Stubborn Cinderella.

A St. Louis Post-Dispatch review of the production of The Goddess of Liberty in St. Louis, Missouri, in 1910 described Fisher's work as follows: "Sallie Fisher is most of the show and she is worth while [sic]. She sings well, dances divinely and is as good to look at as one could wish."

Personal life
Fisher was married to Arthur Houghton for 37 years. Houghton was a theatrical manager. After Fisher married him, she "retired at the peak of her career."

Death
Fisher died of a heart attack, aged 69, at her home in Twentynine Palms, California, on June 8, 1950.

References

External links
 
 
 portrait(NY Public Library, Billy Rose collection)
 portrait gallery(Univ. of Washington, Sayre collection)
Barrymore and Sallie Fisher in A Stubborn Cinderella c.1909(Museum of the City of New York)
findagrave

1880 births
1950 deaths
American stage actresses
Actresses from Wyoming
20th-century American actresses
People from Twentynine Palms, California